Alice Edun, known professionally as Edun, is a Nigerian-Russian singer of dance and gospel music.  She lives in Milan, Italy and is signed to eurodance label Off-Limits, and licensed to Robbins Entertainment in the United States.

Background
Edun was born in St. Petersburg to a Nigerian father and Russian mother She studied in Nigeria and graduated from high school in 1993. Edun started singing as a youngster in African gospel choirs. When she moved to Italy, she sang gospel from 1998 onwards and took part in the Milan Gospel Festival in 2003. While all this was happening, Edun was also experimenting with R&B, soul, funk and jazz styles and performed regularly inside and outside Italy.

In 2004, Edun was chosen by Grammy Award-winning, DJ/Producer Benny Benassi to perform as a vocalists for his "Benny Wants You" appeal program.

In 2005, Edun made her first recording debut as the featured vocalist on the track "Who's Knockin?" by FB (also known as Ferry Corsten and Benny Benassi), released by Dance Therapy, Holland. That same year she also made her solo debut with "Put 'Em Up", a track written by Sannie Carlson and produced by Igor Farvetto. "Put 'Em Up" ended up becoming a sleeper Dance anthem globally two years later, especially in the United States, as her biggest breakthrough hit, peaking at number 2 in the Hot Dance Airplay chart  of Billboard′s August 25, 2007 issue. "Put 'Em Up" is a featured song on the PlayStation 2 and arcade music game Dance Dance Revolution X.

In August 2010, Edun released a follow-up called "My Love Is Here For You." According to Edun, "It's a dance-pop love song, the kind that relates to everyone who is in love with someone but the other is afraid to love you back." The single was released globably through iTunes. Edun also collaborated with new producers and songwriters. She recorded and released "Survive" with Oscar Salguero via Blanco y Negro in Spain and Andorfine Records in Germany. Alice also recently completed new songs with songwriter Stephen Leuenberger from Switzerland.

References

External links
Official website
Edun at MySpace
Edun's Facebook page
Edun discography at e.discogs

Living people
Singers from Saint Petersburg
Italian dance musicians
Italian women singers
Russian dance musicians
Russian women singers
Italian people of Nigerian descent
Italian people of Russian descent
Russian people of Nigerian descent
Russian people of Yoruba descent
Russian emigrants to Italy
Robbins Entertainment artists
Year of birth missing (living people)
Yoruba women musicians